MV Jindal Kamakshi is a Container ship i.e. a Feeder ship which mainly transfers Containers to another ship port.

Accident

Indian navy received a distress call at 2310 IST on 21 June 2015. A Sea King helicopter 42C was sent for rescue and her twenty crew were airlifted. They were taken to INS Shikra for medical attention at 0905 on 22 June 2015.
The vessel has been towed to safety.

References

External links 

 Pictures of the ship Jindal Kamakshi in Problems

Non-combat military operations involving India
Merchant ships of India
Ships built in China
2008 ships